Nickelodeon is a pan-Asian pay television channel operated by Paramount Global, based in Singapore and broadcast to audiences in Southeast Asia and certain regions in Oceania like Polynesia and Papua New Guinea. The channel was launched on 1998 and mainly broadcasts original series from Nickelodeon's namesake television channel in the United States. The programs are broadcast in English.

History
The channel was first launched in the Middle East and North Africa on June 1996 as a 24-hour English-language TV channel.

In October 1998, Nickelodeon decided to reach the popular channel to the Philippines, Japan, Russia & the CIS as an attempt to bring the popular channel to Asia. One of their shorts were Right Here, Right Now (based on the 1993 Nick US shorts) and their ID's were by FRONT. In 2003, it became a part of NickSplat (Nickelodeon's headquarters in Asia).

On October 11, 2006, Viacom's subsidiary MTV Networks Asia Pacific set up a new unit to manage a feed based in Singapore. Nickelodeon was launched in Singapore and expanded its services in Southeast Asia and Polynesia. Nickelodeon Philippines, Nickelodeon Pakistan, and Nickelodeon India started working independently. They started their new website in 2003.

On 15 March 2010, it got a new logo and new programs from the United States. On 11 April 2011, a new schedule was launched to put live-action programs in the primetime slot and launched the Nick Jr. block. On 1 July 2011, the Nick Jr. block was removed. In February 2013, The Nicktoons block launched.

In 2012, Nickelodeon used new graphics used in the US and UK, but only applied to selected programs' promos and station IDs. The former Nick-Asia graphics is still used.

In November 2012, a 60-second ad called Nickelodeon Style aired.

On 18 August 2014, a new feed with a new schedule was launched to replace this feed in the rest of Asia (excluding Indonesia, Malaysia, and the Philippines), Hong Kong, and Taiwan while the feed continues its broadcast and schedule in Indonesia and Malaysia.

On July 17, 2017, the channel was rebranded into the US version. It was made by Superestudio, an Argentinian branding agency.

Availability

Middle East 

In the Middle East, Nickelodeon Asia was made available to Middle Eastern viewers in the region via the ABS-2 satellite and it was broadcast in English. Previously, the channel was made available to Middle Eastern viewers in the region via the Palapa C2 and D satellites until 2010, when Nickelodeon Asia left Palapa D.

Singapore 
In Singapore, Nickelodeon Asia is available in English. The channel was launched on March 2001.

Indonesia 
In Indonesia, Nickelodeon Asia is available in both Indonesian and English and it was launched on February 1999.

Malaysia 

Available since October 1999; currently broadcasting in English, Malaysian, Mandarin Chinese.

Thailand 
In Thailand, Nickelodeon Asia is available on Channel 452 on TrueVisions and it was broadcast in Thai. In 2020, Nickelodeon was extended to AIS Play, TOTipTV & 3BB Giga TV for Major Pay Television Networks in Thailand along with Nick Jr.

Taiwan 
In Taiwan, Nickelodeon Asia is available in Mandarin Chinese.

Hong Kong 
In Hong Kong, Nickelodeon Asia is currently broadcasting in Cantonese, made available since February 2002.

Maldives 
In the Maldives, Nickelodeon and Nick Jr. Asia were launched available on Medianet in June 2018.

Myanmar 
In Myanmar, Nickelodeon Asia is available on Channel 15 on Sky Net and Canal+ Myanmar Channel 114 and is also on OTT Platform Cookie TV.

Sri Lanka 
in Sri Lanka, Nickelodeon Asia launched on August 2018 on Dialog TV, replacing Nick India. However, Nick India continues to broadcast on PEO TV.

South Korea 

In South Korea, Nickelodeon Asia was launched in 2003 in South Korea airing in English with subtitles in Korean and was available through SkyLife. the channel replaced Tooniverse but was later removed in 2006, SkyLife did not carry Nickelodeon until 2014.

On July 1, 2022, Nickelodeon was replaced with KiZmom, and relaunched as a programming block on Tooniverse.

Branded Programming Blocks across Asia

Vietnam 
In Vietnam, Nickelodeon is a programming block on YouTV branded as Nick & You first launched in September, 2016. However, the block was halted on 31 December 2022.

Mainland China 
In Mainland China, Nickelodeon was made available to the Chinese viewers via a programming block branded as HaHa Nick based in Shanghai which existed from May 2005-October 2007 broadcasting in Mandarin Chinese, Nickelodeon is currently defunct in China with programs going the channels such as CNTV.

Kids Choice Awards

Indonesia

The Indonesia Kids Choice Awards is the first Kids Choice Awards set in Asia next to the Philippines. The first show was held since 2008 in Jakarta and was first hosted by Tora Sudiro, Tasya Kamila and Ringgo Agus Rahman and some various Indonesian Artist's over the years. The logo of the show is exactly the same as the US version however, it is designed for the Indonesian version of the show and still read Nickelodeon Indonesia Kids Choice Awards.

Philippines

The Philippines Kids Choice Awards is the second setting of the Kids Choice Awards in Asia preceded by Indonesia. The show was first held since 2008 at the Aliw Theater in Pasay and was first hosted by Michael V. and some various Filipino artists. According to Amit Jain, executive vice-president and managing director of MTV Networks India, China and Southeast Asia, "This is a milestone for Nickelodeon's business in Southeast Asia as it will deliver on Nick's commitment of providing global kids-centric shows and properties which are adapted to reflect local tastes and aspirations." The Philippines KCA has been inactive all over the years.

Programming

Sister channels

Nick Jr. is the preschool channel which replaced the Nick Jr. block on Nickelodeon's main pan-Asian feed on 1 July 2011. It was launched on 18 May 2011 on StarHub TV Channel 304 in Singapore and on TelkomVision Channel 305 in Indonesia. The channel expanded its broadcast to other parts of Southeast Asia thereafter.

Logo History

See also
 Nickelodeon
 Nickelodeon (Philippine TV channel)
 Nickelodeon (Russian TV channel)
 Nickelodeon (Japanese TV channel)
 Nickelodeon (South Korean TV channel)
 Nickelodeon (Indian TV channel)
 Nickelodeon Pakistan
 Nickelodeon (New Zealand TV channel)
 Nickelodeon (Australia and New Zealand)
 Nickelodeon (Malaysian TV channel)

References

External links
 

Children's television channels in the Asia Pacific
Mass media in Southeast Asia
1996 establishments in Asia
Southeast Asia
Television channels and stations established in 1996
Television stations in Thailand
Television stations in Taiwan
Television stations in Singapore
Television stations in Indonesia
Television channels in Brunei
Television stations in Hong Kong
Television stations in Macau
Television stations in Tonga
Television stations in Tuvalu
Television stations in Vanuatu
Television stations in Samoa
Television channels in the Maldives
Television channels in Myanmar
2000 establishments in Indonesia
2003 establishments in South Korea
2018 establishments in Sri Lanka
2018 establishments in the Maldives
2000 establishments in New Zealand
2001 establishments in Singapore
2002 establishments in Hong Kong